Brazilian thrash metal is a musical movement that originated in the 1980s. Though not as large or well known as the North American or European thrash metal movements, it bridged the gap of the mid-1980s and the death metal scene later in the decade and the first-wave of black metal. Although some bands have become mainstream, the scene is an underground icon.

History

1980s: The beginning
During the early eighties, bands from the United States, Germany and Canada, such as Metallica and Slayer (U.S.), Destruction and Kreator (Germany), and Voivod and Exciter (Canada) appeared. At the same time, Brazil had a growing scene and were influenced by the same music: NWOBHM and hardcore punk.

Brazilian rock has its roots in the 1960s, developing from the movement called Jovem Guarda, passing through the stages of progressive rock and heavy metal. In 1982, the first Brazilian heavy metal LP was released by the band Stress from the northern city Belém.

The European and North American heavy metal and hardcore have been a great influence on all these bands, but the first thrash metal (or speed metal) album released officially in Brazil was a split album between two bands in 1984: Ultimatum, by Dorsal Atlântica and Metalmorphose. This came out around the same time as Kill 'Em All by Metallica, War and Pain by Voivod, and Sentence of Death by Destruction. Other bands released demos, like Vulcano from São Paulo and Sepultura from Belo Horizonte.

In the late 1980s, Sepultura achieved success outside of Brazil. The last thrash metal albums to represent the "old-school" style of thrash in Brazil were Mass Illusion by Korzus (1991), Arise by Sepultura (1991), Rotten Authorities by Executer (1991), and The Laws of Scourge by Sarcófago (1991).

Mid and late 1990s

Entering the 90s, thrash was mixed with alternative metal, grunge, industrial music and in Brazil specifically, with the Brazilian "roots" music, often leading to hybrid music between metal and ethnic or world music. This subgenre is sometimes labelled as tribal metal. Sepultura and Overdose (from Belo Horizonte), are credited to be the first and most important acts that mixed thrash with tribal sounds. Bands that did not simply disappear from the scene, had to adapt their sound to new genres that were appearing, such as was the case with Sepultura.

Korzus brought the New York hardcore influences to their sound with the KZS album. Sarcófago put a drum machine in their last studio album entitled Crust. A band from Belo Horizonte named The Mist became an "industrial-thrash" band and Dorsal Atlântica turned into a hardcore/crust variant. Ratos de Porão experimented an approach with alternative metal before returning to a more punk-influenced sound.

During the 1990s, the most important bands to appear in the decade were Scars, Distraught and Zero Vision. But their sound had a greater influence from groove metal of Machine Head than that of thrash metal.

2000s onward
In the 2000s, bands Executer and Holocausto had their "come back", and Max Cavalera's Soulfly released an album that is almost "old-school" thrash with the mixing of new and old styles; the band Ratos de Porão returned to the crossover style.

There are a lot of new thrash metal bands existing together with the old ones who returned. New bands since the year 2000 have been releasing albums on independent record labels. Bands such as Torture Squad have been frequently touring across South America and Europe.

Regional scenes
There were three regions where the Brazilian thrash metal was originated (Belo Horizonte, São Paulo and Rio de Janeiro). The most prominent of the three scenes, was from the city, Belo Horizonte, where Sepultura came from.

In Belo Horizonte, the scene had some of the most extreme bands, close to what came to be named as death metal. Bands such as Sepultura, Sarcófago and Mutilator continued further and were in some ways more extreme than the German thrash metal bands; they were influenced by European extreme metal bands like Sodom and Hellhammer and had a very raw and primitive production, which "added to the atmosphere" according to their fans, while others would claim they "sounded 'worse' than their European counterparts". The band Sarcófago wore an early form of corpse paint and their first album I.N.R.I. "was huge among Norwegian black metalers". Sarcófago, as well as Sepultura, were also important for a chaotic, non-Norwegian black metal style called war metal. The first prominent band of the scene were Overdose, a traditional heavy metal act that became increasingly progressive and more aggressive over time. Sepultura members used to borrow equipment from them, and were invited to take the B-side of Overdose's debut record, which became the Século XX/Bestial Devastation split. Later on, Sepultura started to boycott Overdose and actively try to stop their success. Jairo "Tormentor" Guedz, the original guitarist of Sepultura, joined Overdose for a short period as a bass player. After disbanding, Cláudio David (lead guitarist) formed Elektra, and André "Zé Baleia" Márcio (drummer) formed Eminence. Jairo also played bass in Eminence. The active sabotage of Sepultura towards the other bands from the city made the scene slowly go to ostracism, since no one else could get successful.

In São Paulo, the scene was closer to crossover thrash or what is more commonly known as American thrash. Bands such as Ratos de Porão and Lobotomia, played a style more akin to hardcore and started transforming into a more thrash metal sound, alongside the original thrash metal bands, such as Korzus and MX.

In Rio de Janeiro, the bands sounded similar to European bands of the time. Important bands from this time period were Taurus, Metrallion, and Antitese.

References

Bibliography

20th-century music genres
21st-century music genres
Thrash metal
Brazilian rock music
Brazilian styles of music
Extreme metal
Music scenes